"Naughty Girls (Need Love Too)" is a song recorded by English singer Samantha Fox for her self-titled second studio album (1987). It was released as a single in 1988 and was a collaboration between Fox and hip-hop group Full Force. It describes how a "naughty girl" has unexpectedly fallen in love. With the song initially presented to Fox in a less melodic form, she insisted on the addition of guitar. Her producers were at first reluctant to comply, but later added the distinctive guitar sound with the use of a Fairlight.

In the US, "Naughty Girls" peaked at #3 on June 4, 1988. It was ranked as the 28th most popular song of that year. It was also a top ten hit in New Zealand, Finland and Canada. The Full Force Naughty House Mix contains a sample of Boney M.'s late 70's song "Ma Baker".

Critical reception
Pan-European magazine Music & Media wrote, "Riding high in the American Billboard charts (no. 3 at press time), this Full Force production is straight to the point. A nervous, walloping beat is set next to Fox's bubbling vocals, giving it precisely that extra it needed." J.D. Considine from the Baltimore Sun described it as "not so much a song as a T-shirt with a rhythm section."

Music video
The single's music video features Fox with pink hair and a leather jacket in front of a graffiti-covered building. She is surrounded by street toughs who join Fox in a dance routine. The members of Full Force are shown providing backing vocals.

Track listing
 US Maxi Single (1102-2-JDJ) Jive
"Naughty Girls (Need Love Too) (Single Edit)" 4:20
"Naughty Girls (Need Love Too) (U.K. Mix)" 4:10
"Naughty Girls (Need Love Too) (Full Force Naughty House Mix)" 6:34
"Naughty Girls (Need Love Too) (Special Extended Version)" 5:52

 CA Vinyl 7" (1089-7-J) Jive
"Naughty Girls (Need Love Too) (Full Force Mix)" 4:20
"Dream City" 4:55

 UK Vinyl 12" (FOXY T 9) Jive
"Naughty Girls (Need Love Too) (Special Extended Version)" 5:52
"Naughty Girls (Need Love Too) (Jon's Savage Edit)" 3:13
"Dream City" 4:52

Charts

Weekly charts

Year-end charts

In popular culture
The song is featured in the infamous "Interspecies Erotica" scene from the 2006 Kevin Smith film Clerks II.
The music video is featured in the 39th Beavis and Butt-head episode named "Tornado".

References

Samantha Fox songs
1988 singles
Freestyle music songs
1987 songs
Song recordings produced by Full Force
Jive Records singles